Benny B (real name Abdel Hamid Gharbaoui, born 11 December 1968 in Molenbeek-Saint-Jean) is a Belgian artist. He was the leader of a Belgian hip-hop group of the same name. Their singles "Vous êtes fous!" and "Qu'est-ce qu'on fait maintenant ?" peaked respectively at #3 and #2 in France in 1990. The group enjoyed a rapid success, followed by an equally quick loss of public interest. They disbanded after their second album.

Discography
L'Album Featuring Daddy K (1990)
1. "Vous êtes fous!"
2. "D.J. D'enfer"	
3. "Dis-moi bébé"
4. "Do You Speak Martien ?"	
5. "Colère"
6. "Qu'est-ce qu'on fait maintenant ?"	
7. "Écoute ! C'est du rap français"	
8. "Elle"
9. "Yo ! Home Boys"
10. "Vous êtes fous !" (Spanish)	
Daddy K, Perfect et Moi (1991)
1. "Parce qu'on est jeunes"	
2. "Fille facile"
3. "Je t'aime à l'infini"	
4. "Respect"
5. "Oui, c'est du rap français"
6. "10.9.8.7..."
7. "Est-ce que vous êtes là ?"	
8. "Frère"
9. "Daddy's Dance"
10. "Est-ce que je peux ?"	
11. "10.9.8.7..." (mix)

References

External links
 3615 Benny B A website about Benny B (feat. Daddy K et Perfect)

1968 births
Living people
Belgian people of Moroccan descent
Belgian rappers
People from Molenbeek-Saint-Jean